The 2009 Tour de Wallonie was the 36th edition of the Tour de Wallonie cycle race and was held from 25 to 29 July 2009. The race started in Waremme and finished in Tournai. The race was won by Julien El Fares.

General classification

References

Tour de Wallonie
Tour de Wallonie